TV Großwallstadt  is a team handball club from Großwallstadt.

Achievements
European Club Championship: 2
1979, 1980
Cup Winner's Cup Finalists: 2
1986, 1988
IHF Cup: 1
1984
City Cup: 1
2000
German First League of Handball: 6
1978, 1979, 1980, 1981, 1984, 1990
German Cup of Handball: 4
1980, 1984, 1987, 1989
 Double
 Winners (2): 1979–80, 1983–84

External links
 Club website

German handball clubs
Handball-Bundesliga
Sport in Bavaria
1925 establishments in Germany
Sports clubs established in 1925